Paungde Township  is a township in Pyay District in the Bago Region of Burma. The principal town is Paungde.

References

Townships of the Bago Region
Pyay District